= Pipliya Bajkhan =

- village
- Location within Madhya Pradesh Location within India
- Coordinates: 23.3183095°N 77.4278838°E
- Country: India
- State: Madhya Pradesh
- District: Bhopal
- Tehsil: Huzur
- Elevation: 483 m (1,585 ft)

Population (2011)
  - Total: 1,169
- Time zone: UTC+5:30 (IST)
- ISO 3166 code: MP-IN
- 2011 census code: 482458

Pipliya Bajkhan is a village in the Bhopal district of Madhya Pradesh, India. It is located in the Huzur tehsil and the Phanda block.

== Demographics ==
According to the 2011 census of India, Pipliya Bajkhan has 246 households. The effective literacy rate (i.e. the literacy rate of population excluding children aged 6 and below) is 75.36%.

Demographics (2011 Census)
	Total	Male	Female
Population	1169	608	561
Children aged below 6 years	199	115	84
Scheduled caste	100	50	50
Scheduled tribe	16	12	4
Literates	731	424	307
Workers (all)	533	318	215
Main workers (total)	361	228	133
Main workers: Cultivators	149	95	54
Main workers: Agricultural labourers	142	77	65
Main workers: Household industry workers	0	0	0
Main workers: Other	70	56	14
Marginal workers (total)	172	90	82
Marginal workers: Cultivators	65	31	34
Marginal workers: Agricultural labourers	88	41	47
Marginal workers: Household industry workers	0	0	0
Marginal workers: Others	19	18	1
Non-workers	636	290	346
